Parsa is a village located in Mohammadabad tehsil of Ghazipur district, Uttar Pradesh. It has total 1,148 families residing. Parsa has population of 6,330 as per Population Census 2011.

Administration
This village is administrated by Gram Panchayat through its Pradhan who is elected representative of village.

Notable people
Vinod Rai, former Comptroller and Auditor General of India
A. N. Rai, former Vice Chancellor of Mizoram University
Ramnarayan Rai, Freedom fighter Freedom fighters of India

References

Villages in Ghazipur district